The 1982 Mississippi State Bulldogs football team represented Mississippi State University during the 1982 NCAA Division I-A football season.

Schedule

Roster
QB John Bond, Jr.

References

Mississippi State
Mississippi State Bulldogs football seasons
Mississippi State Bulldogs football